Say It In Slang is an album and the 6th studio Album by Marshmallow Coast.

Track listing

Personnel 
Andy Gonzales - Song Writing, Guitar, Keyboards, Vocals

Derek Almstead - Bass, Drums, Vocals

Heather McIntosh - Cello

Bill Oglesby - Saxophone

Andrew Heaton - Violin

Emily Growden - Vocals

References 

2006 albums
Marshmallow Coast albums